Jack Weldon Jennings (February 23, 1927June 11, 1993) was a professional American football player who played offensive lineman for eight seasons for the Chicago Cardinals.

References

1927 births
1993 deaths
American football offensive linemen
Chicago Cardinals players
Ohio State Buckeyes football players
Players of American football from Columbus, Ohio